Tol (also known as Toleisom) is the largest and most populous island in the Faichuk group of islands in Chuuk State, Federated States of Micronesia. Located in the west of Truk Lagoon, it is surrounded by the other islands such as Onei, Paata, and Polle.

Tol island is a municipality of the State of Chuuk. The island has 10 main villages. The 10 main villages  are sometimes divided into a Division or Kumi usually whenever there is a Mayoral Election on the island or within the State of Chuuk.

•Ikku Division (Ikkumi) consist the villages of Wichukuno, Chukienu, and Foson.

•Yongku Division (Yongkumi) consist the villages of Foup and Foupo.

•Niku Division (Nikumi) consist the villages of Winifei, Nechocho, Faro, and Munien.

•Sangku Division (Sangkumi) only consist the village of Wonip.

Most of these 10 main villages also contain sub-villages or sections of each village. Within the sub-villages, there are numerous areas of each sub-village.

The high jungle forest which surrounds this peak is the sole habitat of the endemic great Truk white-eye.

Islands of Chuuk State